Muhammad Syafiq bin Mohamed Zainal (born 19 July 1991) is a Singaporean footballer who plays as a forward for Balestier Khalsa RC.

Club career

Syafiq began his football career with Balestier Khalsa in the S.League in 2010. He moved to Young Lions the following season.

In January 2013, he was named in the LionsXII squad for the 2013 Malaysia Super League. He scored the winner in a Super League match over Terengganu on 19 January.

He signed for Balestier United RC after being released by the Tigers in 2016.

Personal life

Syafiq graduated from the Singapore Sports School in 2007.

Career statistics

Club

. Caps and goals may not be correct.

 Young Lions and LionsXII are ineligible for qualification to AFC competitions in their respective leagues.
 Young Lions withdrew from the 2011 and 2012 Singapore Cup, and the 2011 Singapore League Cup due to participation in AFC and AFF youth competitions.

Honours

Club
LionsXII
Malaysia Super League: 2013

References

1991 births
Living people
Singaporean footballers
LionsXII players
Balestier Khalsa FC players
Singapore Premier League players
Singaporean people of Malay descent
Association football forwards
Malaysia Super League players
Young Lions FC players
Footballers at the 2010 Asian Games
Asian Games competitors for Singapore